This article contains a list of air groups of Imperial Japanese Navy Air Service. Literal translation of 海軍航空隊 (Kaigun Kōkūtai) is "Naval Air Group", however, "Naval" is typically omitted in most of the established English-language sources (e.g.). The list below follows the same convention.

Place name

Numbered name

Regional name

Appendix

Carrier Aircraft Group

Until January 1944
Aircraft carrier

Seaplane tender

After February 1944

See also
Kōkūtai
List of Air Fleet of the Imperial Japanese Navy
List of Imperial Japanese Navy carrier division and air flotilla
List of Imperial Japanese Navy flying squadron

Notes

Bibliography

 
 
 

Shin-Jinbutsuoraisha Co., Ltd., Tōkyō, Japan.
Kingendaishi Hensankai, Military history of the Imperial Japanese Navy Air Groups and Imperial Japanese Army Flying Regiments, 2001, .
Rekishi Dokuhon, Document of the war No. 52 Naval Air Group and Kamikaze, 2001, .
Air World, Air World Inc., Tōkyō, Japan.
Special issue Photo album of Imperial Japanese Navy Aircraft in World War II, 1987.
Bunrin-Dō Co., Ltd., Tōkyō, Japan.
Famous airplanes of the world
No. 27, Type 96 Carrier Fighter, 1991.
No. 32, Type 97 Carrier Torpedo Bomber, 1992.
No. 33, Type 99 Carrier Dive Bomber, 1992.
No. 44, Type 93 Intermediate Trainer, 1994.
No. 47, Imperial Japanese Navy Reconnaissance Seaplane, 1994.
No. 49, Type 2 Flying boat, 1994, .
No. 55, Type Zero Carrier Fighter Model 11–21, 1995, .
No. 56, Type Zero Carrier Fighter Model 22–63, 1996, .
No. 57, Navy Night Fighter "Gekko", 1996, .
No. 59, Type 1 Attack Bomber, 1996, .
No. 61, Navy Interceptor "Raiden", 1996, .
No. 69, Navy Carrier Dive-Bomber "Suisei", 1998, .
No. 91, Type 96 Attack Bomber, 2001, .
No. 108, Carrier Reconnaissance Plane "Saiun", 2005, .
No. 124, Kyofu, Shiden, Shidenkai, 2007, .
No. 130, Type 99 Carrier Dive Bomber, 2009, .
No. 136, Navy Type Zero Observation Seaplane, 2009, .
Special Edition Vol. 1, Navy Bomber "Ginga" [Frances], 2000, .
Special Edition Vol. 6, Type Zero Carrier Fighter, 2012, .
Koku-Fan Illustrated
No. 42, Japanese Imperial Army & Navy Aircraft Color, Markig, 1988.
No. 96, Photo history of the 302nd Naval Air Group "San-Maru-Futa", 1997.
Koku-Fan Illustrated Special
Japanese Military Aircraft Illustrated Vol. 1, Fighters, 1982.
Japanese Military Aircraft Illustrated Vol. 2, Bombers, 1982.
Japanese Military Aircraft Illustrated Vol. 3, Reconnaissance / Flying boat / Trainer / Transport, 1983.
Ushio Shobō (Ushioshobokojinsha Co., Ltd.), Tōkyō, Japan.
The Maru Graphic Quarterly
No. 9, Photo album of Japanese Fighters, 1972.
No. 10, Photo album of Japanese Bombers, 1972.
The Maru Special
Japanese Naval Vessels No. 2, Aircraft carrier Akagi / Kaga, 1975.
Japanese Naval Vessels No. 16, Aircraft carrier Ryūjō / Hōshō, 1978.
Japanese Naval Vessels No. 25, Japanese seaplane tenders w/ auxiliary seaplane tenders, 1979.
Japanese Naval Vessels No. 56, Japanese aircraft carriers III, 1979.
Japanese Naval Vessels No. 126, Japanese aircraft carriers I, 1987.
Japanese Naval Vessels No. 127, Japanese aircraft carriers II / Japanese seaplane tenders I, 1987.
Japanese Naval Vessels No. 128, Japanese aircraft carriers III / Japanese seaplane tenders II, 1987.
Japanese Naval Vessels No. 129, Japanese aircraft carriers in wartime I, 1987.
Japanese Naval Vessels No. 130, Japanese aircraft carriers in wartime II / Japanese seaplane tenders III, 1987.
Japanese Naval Vessels No. 131, Japanese aircraft carriers in wartime III, 1988.
Warship Mechanism Vol. 3, Mechanisms of Japanese 29 Aircraft Carriers, 1981.
The Maru Mechanic
No. 12, Type 0 Reconnaissance Seaplane, 1978.
No. 15, Nakajima C6N1 Carrier Reconnaissance-plane "Saiun" C6N, 1979.
No. 18, Nakajima Type 97 Carrier Torpedo Bomber B5N, 1979.
No. 19, Kawanishi Type 2 Flying boat H8K, 1979.
No. 20, Mitsubishi Type 0 Obseravation Seaplane F1M (Pete), 1980.
No. 24, Kawanishi Type 2 Flying boat (H8K2) 426, 1980.
No. 27, Naval Aero-Technical Arsenal Carrier Dive Bomber "Suisei comet D4Y", 1981.
No. 28, Mitsubishi Type 96 Carrier Fighter (A5M), 1981.
No. 30, Nakajima carrier torpedo bomber "Tenzan" B6N, 1981.
No. 31, Douglas DC-3 / L2D Type Zero Navy Transport, 1981.
No. 34, Aichi Navy Type 99 Carrier Dive-Bomber (D3A), 1982.
No. 36, Kawanishi Navy Type 94 Reconnaissance Seaplane (E7K), 1982.
No. 46, Naval Aero-Technical Arsenal Bomber "Ginga" P1Y / Mitsubishi Type 1 Attack Bomber G4M (Betty), 1984.
Model Art, Model Art Co. Ltd., Tōkyō, Japan.
No. 242, Special issue Zero Fighter, 1984.
No. 272, Special issue Camouflage & Markings of Imperial Japanese Navy Fighters in W.W.II, 1986.
No. 304, Special issue Kawanishi N1K1/N1K2-J, 1987.
No. 378, Special issue Pearl Harbor, 1991.
No. 406, Special issue Camouflage & Markings of Imperial Japanese Navy Bombers in W.W.II, 1993.
No. 431, 1994.
No. 439, Special issue Heroes of the Imperial Japanese Navy Air Force in 1937–1945, 1994.
No. 458, Special issue Imperial Japanese Navy Air Force Suicide Attack Unit "Kamikaze", 1995.
No. 470, Special issue I.J.N. Interceptor Fighter Raiden (J2M series), 1996.
No. 500, 1997.
No. 510, Special issue Camouflage & Markings of the I.J.N. Fighters, 1998.
No. 525, Special issue Shūsui and Jet aircraft / Rocket aircraft of the Imperial Japanese Army and Navy, 1998.
No. 532, 1999.
No. 541, Special issue Type 2 Flying Boat and Imperial Japanese Navy Flying Boats, 1999.
No. 553, Special issue I.J.N. Carrier Attack Bomber, 2000.
No. 565, Special issue Imperial Japanese Navy Seaplanes, 2000.
No. 573, Special issue Pearl Harbor (New Edition), 2000.
No. 587, Special issue Imperial Japanese Navy Fighter N1K1 Kyōfū, N1K1-J Shiden, N1K2-J Shidenkai, 2001.
No. 595, Special issue Night fighters of the Imperial Japanese Army and Navy, 2001.
No. 640, 2003.
No. 666, 2004.
No. 831, Special issue Model Art Profile No. 11, "Raiden of Imperial Japanese Navy (Mitsubishi J2M)", 2011.
No. 847, Special issue Model Art Profile No. 12, "A6M of IJN (Part 1)", 2012.
No. 857, Special issue Model Art Profile No. 13, "A6M of IJN (Part 2)", 2012.
Rekishi Gunzō, History of Pacific War, Gakken, Tōkyō, Japan.
Vol. 13, Shōkaku class aircraft carrier, 1997, .
Extra, Perfect guide, The aircraft carriers of the Imperial Japanese Navy & Army, 2003, .
Ships of the world, Kaijinsha Co., Ltd., Tōkyō, Japan.
No. 481, Special issue Vol. 40, History of Japanese aircraft carriers, 1994.
No. 736, Special issue Vol. 95, History of Japanese aircraft carriers, 2011.
Koei, Kanagawa Prefecture, Japan.
Aero Military Collection #2, Japanese Navy Fighter part 1, 2005, .
Aero Military Collection #5, Japanese Navy Fighter part 2, 2006, .
Japan Center for Asian Historical Records (http://www.jacar.go.jp/english/index.html), National Archives of Japan, Tokyo, Japan.
Reference Code: C12070201700, Administrative Order, January–March 1944, Naval Minister's Secretariat/Ministry of the Navy, 1944.
Reference Code: C12070204300, Administrative Order, March 1945, Naval Minister's Secretariat/Ministry of the Navy, 1945.
And other each volumes. (a lot of notice of the Imperial Japanese Navy.)

 
Air
Air groups